Dick Webb was a British stage and film actor of the silent era.

Selected filmography
 Kent, the Fighting Man (1916)
 Angel Esquire (1919)
 The Channings (1920)
 Miss Charity (1921)
 The Croxley Master (1921)
 The Scarlet Letter (1922)
 Potter's Clay (1922)
 Young Lochinvar (1923)

References

External links
 

Year of birth missing
Year of death missing
English male silent film actors
English male stage actors
20th-century English male actors